The Hop Farm Family Park is a  Country Park in Beltring, near East Peckham in Kent, England, is over 450 years old, and has the largest collection of oast houses in the world.

History
Until 1997 the hop farm was known as The Whitbread Hop Farm and was owned by the Whitbread brewery.  Originally a working farm, the brewery opened it up to visitors. As Whitbread were seeking to move out of the brewing trade, they began looking for new owners in the 1990s.

In 1997, Mohamed Al-Fayed wanted to buy The Hop Farm to stable his Shire horses, and another rival wanted it for a rare breeds centre, but Brent and Fiona Pollard were successful in their purchase, at a cost of 2 million pounds (beating their nearest rival by £5000). Unfortunately, due to mismanagement, the business was in trouble; turnover was around £700,000 a year and in 1995 losses were £1.5 million. In their first year the Pollands reduced staff from 50 to 14 and suffered a drought, floods, a gas pipeline installation and the outbreak of foot and mouth disease.  However they broke even, and in subsequent years their profits grew. In 2006, The Hop Farm was sold to Kent Attractions Ltd and in 2007 sold again to Peter Bull. In 2012, The Hop Farm underwent radical management restructure in an effort to halt a five-year slide in visitor numbers, however in 2013 the company went into liquidation. It was rescued by another company from within The Hop Farm group.

Events

The main event was the annual War and Peace Show. First put on in 1982, it has grown to be the largest military vehicle show in the world, with 10,000 enthusiasts and over 3,500 vehicles attending. It moved to Folkestone Race Course in 2012, after the organiser became unhappy with the Hop Farm owners. The show is set to return to The Hop Farm in 2017.

In addition to this, the park hosts a number of events such as European Championship Monster Truck Racing, The Kent County Fair, and Paws in the Park (It has since moved to the Kent Showground Detling).

The Hop Farm is also an outdoor music venue. In 2006 a concert starring Craig David should have launched the Tunbridge Wells SpaFest, to mark the 400th anniversary of the founding of the town but it was called off due to local complaints, and a substitute concert was staged at The Hop Farm. That year also saw Terry Wogan's Summer Proms staged there.

Over the first weekend of July between 2008 and 2012, the Hop Farm Festival was held at the park. Starting in 2008, the festival grew to a capacity of over 50,000 people, playing host to many internationally artists including Bob Dylan, Prince, The Eagles, Blondie, Neil Young, Primal Scream, The Fratellis and Florence and the Machine among others, but after making a loss in 2012, the festival was cancelled in 2013 due to poor ticket sales. Since 2015 the park has been the location of Chilled in a Field Festival.

References

External links
Official Site

Buildings and structures in Kent
Country parks in Kent
Amusement parks in England
Museums in Tonbridge and Malling
Farm museums in England
Wax museums
Open-air museums in England
Humulus